Adesuwa Thongpond Pariyasapat Aighewi is an American fashion model and filmmaker. In 2018, she was chosen as the runner up for “Breakout Star of the Year” by models.com. As of January 2019, Aighewi ranks as one of the “Top 50” models by models.com.

Early life
Adesuwa Aighewi was born in Minnesota to a Thai-born Chinese mother and a Nigerian father. Before modeling she was a chemistry student at the University of Maryland Eastern Shore where she started attending at age 15. She once interned for NASA. As her parents are environmental scientists, she moved frequently and spent half of her childhood in Nigeria.

Career
Aighewi was discovered on the campus of the University of Maryland Eastern Shore. She has walked for Alexander Wang, Coach, Louis Vuitton, Chanel, Kenzo, Kate Spade, Miu Miu, Bottega Veneta, Marc Jacobs, Yeezy, Michael Kors, Prabal Gurung, Christian Dior, Fendi, and Tommy Hilfiger among others.
She has appeared in advertisements for Tom Ford, Marc Jacobs, Vera Wang, and Chanel. Adesuwa's break out video "Spring in Harlem" debuted on LOVE.com and was written up by Forbes.

Videography

References

American female models
Living people
American people of Chinese descent
American people of Nigerian descent
University of Maryland Eastern Shore alumni
Female models from Minnesota
Nigerian female models
Year of birth missing (living people)
American Buddhists
The Society Management models
Age controversies
Elite Model Management models
21st-century American women